Rasim Ljajić (born 28 January 1964) is a Serbian politician who served as the Deputy Prime Minister of Serbia and the Minister of Trade, Tourism and Telecommunications from 27 July 2012 to 28 October 2020. He is the president of the Social Democratic Party of Serbia, elected from 21 January 2007. Ljajić was also the president of the National Council for Cooperation with the Hague Tribunal.

Education
Ljajić graduated from the University of Sarajevo School of Medicine.

Political career
In 1990, Ljajić was elected Secretary General of the Party of Democratic Action of Sandžak as one of its founders, a branch of the SDA in the Republic of Bosnia and Herzegovina, aimed at gathering Bosniaks in Serbia. In 1993 he left the party and with dissidents formed the Sandžak Democratic Party, criticizing Sulejman Ugljanin for being an extremist and endorsing separatism from Yugoslavia in an effort to join an enlarged Bosnia dominated by Bosnian Muslims.

One of the Democratic Opposition of Serbia leaders, he became Minister of Human and Minority Rights in 2000 after the fall of Slobodan Milošević, and his mandate as a minister was extended in the rump DS-led 2001 government.

Ljajić is the long-term Head of the Coordination Team with the Hague Tribunal. In the 2003 parliamentary election he unsuccessfully led a "Together for Tolerance" coalition, along with Nenad Čanak of the League of Social Democrats of Vojvodina and Jožef Kasa of the Alliance of Vojvodina Hungarians. The coalition received 4.2% of the vote and did not pass the 5% threshold.

Personal life
Ljajić is an ethnic Bosniak. His relative and close friend Dževad Ljajić died in the military helicopter crash in Serbia on the night of 14 March 2015, which also claimed six other lives.

On 10 April 2022, Ljajić was seriously injured in a car accident on the Belgrade-Niš Highway near Ražanj. His associate and former MP Branko Gogić was killed in the accident.

References

External links

 Ministry of Human and Minority Rights
 Socialdemocratic Party of Serbia
 Official presentation

1964 births
Living people
Bosniaks of Serbia
Politicians from Novi Pazar
Government ministers of Serbia
Social Democratic Party of Serbia politicians
Members of the National Assembly (Serbia)
University of Sarajevo alumni
Deputy Prime Ministers of Serbia